Shuttle is a space flight simulator game developed by Vektor Grafix and published by Virgin Games. It was released in 1992 for the IBM PC, Amiga and Atari ST.

Description 

In the game, players control a Space Shuttle that departs from the Vehicle Assembly Building and as it returns to Earth at the Shuttle Landing Facility.

Gameplay is broken up into missions that simulate actual Space Shuttle missions, including launching the Hubble Space Telescope and using the Manned Maneuvering Unit to repair satellites.

Due to the complexity of the missions, players could receive optional guidance. Instructions were passed to the player through a teleprinter, and when those instructions required the player to use the shuttle controls, a flashing box would indicate the appropriate switch or knob. This meant that players could play without needing to memorize the manual, a feature which was highly praised upon its release.

The game supported multiple different camera angles, rather than the standard control panel and external view found in most simulators of the time. The player could also look out of any of the cockpit windows, including back into the payload bay when retrieving or releasing satellites, and some of the CCTV cameras on the Remote Manipulator System. The developers also provided in-game information and  diagrams on each of the major Space Shuttle systems. The publishers also supplied a game manual and large poster showing the control panels.

The game was released with numerous bugs and issues, particularly with the autopilot often getting confused and leading to peculiar re-entry trajectories. In earlier versions, the final mission was impossible to complete.

Reception
Computer Gaming World applauded the level of detail accomplished in Shuttle, and Stanley Trevena reviewed the game for Computer Gaming World, and stated that "Players with an interest in space and hard-core simulation fans alike will blast off into orbit with this new simulation from Virgin." The magazine ran it in their 1992 "Simulation of the year", which ultimately went to Falcon 3.0 by Spectrum Holobyte.

In 1996, Computer Gaming World declared Shuttle the 50th-worst computer game ever released.

See also
Space Shuttle: A Journey into Space (1983)
Project Space Station (1985)
E.S.S. Mega (1991)
Buzz Aldrin's Race Into Space (1993), a US-Soviet Space Race simulator

References

External links

Amiga version Review
Atari ST screenshots

1992 video games
Amiga games
Atari ST games
DOS games
Space flight simulator games
Video games developed in the United Kingdom
Realistic space simulators
Single-player video games